Dominic William Lanza (born May 20, 1976) is a United States district judge of the United States District Court for the District of Arizona. He was formerly an Assistant United States Attorney for the District of Arizona.

Education and early career 

Lanza earned his Bachelor of Arts, summa cum laude, from Dartmouth College and his Juris Doctor, cum laude, from Harvard Law School, where he served as editor and transition chair of the Harvard Law Review. While in college, he was an All-Ivy League, All-America, and Academic All-America football player and was named the outstanding member of his graduating class.

After graduating from law school, he served as a law clerk to Judge Pamela Ann Rymer of the United States Court of Appeals for the Ninth Circuit. He then practiced for five years as an associate in the constitutional and appellate law practice group of Gibson, Dunn & Crutcher. Before becoming a judge, Lanza served as Chief and Executive Assistant United States Attorney for the District of Arizona.

Federal judicial service 

On January 23, 2018, President Trump announced his intent to nominate Lanza to become a United States District Judge of the United States District Court for the District of Arizona. On January 24, 2018, his nomination was sent to the United States Senate. He was nominated to the seat vacated by Judge Susan Ritchie Bolton, who assumed senior status on September 1, 2016. On March 7, 2018, a hearing on his nomination was held before the Senate Judiciary Committee. On April 19, 2018, his nomination was reported out of committee by a 16–5 vote. On September 6, 2018, his nomination was confirmed by a 60–35 vote. He received his judicial commission on September 10, 2018.

Memberships 

He has been a member of the Federalist Society since 2015.

Personal life 
Lanza is the younger brother of popular Survivor fandom writer Mario J. Lanza. Lanza's father was a personal injury attorney.

References

External links 
 

1976 births
Living people
21st-century American lawyers
21st-century American judges
American people of Italian descent
Arizona lawyers
Arizona Republicans
Assistant United States Attorneys
Dartmouth College alumni
Federalist Society members
Harvard Law School alumni
Judges of the United States District Court for the District of Arizona
Lawyers from Seattle
People associated with Gibson Dunn
United States district court judges appointed by Donald Trump